Tine Cederkvist Viskær (born 21 March 1979) is a Danish football goalkeeper who plays for the Denmark women's national football team. At club level she has played in the Damallsvenskan and Australia's W-League for LdB Malmö and Perth Glory. She previously spent seven years at Brøndby IF in the Elitedivisionen, making a total of 216 appearances across all competitions.

References

External links
Danish Football Union (DBU) statistics

1979 births
Living people
Danish women's footballers
Danish expatriates in Australia
Denmark women's international footballers
Expatriate women's footballers in Sweden
Expatriate women's soccer players in Australia
Brøndby IF (women) players
Women's association football goalkeepers
Damallsvenskan players
FC Rosengård players
2007 FIFA Women's World Cup players
Ballerup-Skovlunde Fodbold (women) players